Pilgrim's Progress Road Bridge is a historic stone arch bridge located at Rhinebeck, Dutchess County, New York. It was built about 1858 and is a triple arch stone masonry structure built of mortared random fieldstone.

The bridge is one of two stone bridges that carry Miller Road over Landsman Kill, the first, Salisbury Turnpike Bridge, is a single arch bridge east of New York State Route 308. Pilgrim's Progress bridge is found south of School House Lane, after Miller Road turns from east to south. It was added to the National Register of Historic Places in 1987.

References

Road bridges on the National Register of Historic Places in New York (state)
Bridges completed in 1858
Transportation buildings and structures in Dutchess County, New York
National Register of Historic Places in Dutchess County, New York
Stone arch bridges in the United States